A moonbase is a facility on the surface of the Moon, enabling human activity on the Moon. As such, it is different from a lunar space station in orbit around the Moon, like the planned Lunar Gateway of the Artemis program. Moonbases can be for robotic or human use, in both cases not necessarily including lunar habitation facilities. A base might be a step towards colonization.

Missions to the Moon have so far realized only temporary single-mission bases, (Tranquility Base being the first), as well as some small permanent installations. Plans for establishing facilities on the Moon that could enable sustained human activity at the Moon have been proposed and are actively pursued nationally and increasingly internationally by space agencies.

Chinese concepts 

In 2020, China proposed the International Lunar Research Station (ILRS), a somewhat similar proposal to the Moon Village, with Roscosmos and ESA showing interest. The first steps toward establishing the ILRS will be taken through Phase IV of the Chinese Lunar Exploration Program, consisting of Chang'e 6, 7, and 8, as well as the Russian missions, Luna 25, 26, and 27. Long-term robotic and short-term crew missions at the ILRS are expected to begin in the early 2030s. Roscosmos signed a memorandum of understanding on cooperation in the creation of the ILRS with CNSA on March 9, 2021. There is a projected timeline stretching from the 2030s to 2045.

The China National Space Administration (CNSA) has commenced the Chang'e program for exploring the Moon to investigate the prospect of lunar mining, specifically for mining isotope helium-3 for use as an energy source on Earth.  CNSA director Luan Enjie has stated that humans must learn to leave Earth and "set up a self-sufficient extraterrestrial homeland".

On March 9, 2021, Russia and China signed a memorandum of understanding for the joint construction of the International Lunar Research Station (ILRS) around 2035.

Moon Village concept

The Moon Village concept was presented in 2015.  "Village" in this context refers to international public and private investors, scientists, engineers, universities, and businessmen coming together to discuss interests and capabilities to build and share infrastructure on the Moon and in cislunar space for a variety of purposes. It is neither an ESA project nor a program, but being organized, loosely, by a nonprofit organization seeking to give a platform for an open international architecture and collaboration. In other words, Moon Village seeks to create a vision where both international cooperation and the commercialization of space can thrive.

The open nature of the concept would encompass any kind of lunar activities, whether robotic or astronauts, 3D printed habitats, refueling stations, relay orbiters, astronomy, exploiting resources, or even tourism. The idea is to achieve at least some degree of coordination and exploitation of potential synergies and to create a permanent sustainable presence on the surface of the Moon, whether robotic or crewed. Jan Wörner, ESA Director General until 2021, described in 2017 the Village simply as "an understanding, not a single facility". This initiative is meant as the first step in coming together as a species and developing the partnerships and "know how" before attempting to do the same on Mars.  The Director General of ESA, Jan Wörner, states that this vision of synergy can be as inspiring as the International Space Station but on a truly global, international-cooperation basis, and he proposes this approach as a replacement for the orbiting International Space Station, which is due to be decommissioned in 2024.

China has expressed interest, and NASA has also expressed interest in the potential synergy it offers to the proposed Lunar Gateway. The private aerospace company Blue Origin has also expressed early interest and offered to develop a cargo lander with a  capacity of usable payload. Astronaut Buzz Aldrin has long urged his fellow Americans to cooperate with international partners to reach the Moon. The State Space Agency of Ukraine has agreed to uphold MVA principles and cooperate with the MVA to develop "sustainable habitation" of the Moon.

While Woerner is the most famous advocate for Moon Village, it is not an ESA program. Instead, the concept is being organized, loosely, by a nonprofit organization established in November 2017 called the Moon Village Association. It is a non-profit organization, registered in Vienna, with the mission to create a global forum for the development of the Moon Village, and to potentially implement a permanent human settlement near the lunar south pole, taking advantage of near-continuous sunlight and nearby deposits of ice and other useful volatiles. In 2018, the Vienna University of Technology got sponsorship from ESA for a design workshop on the topic of the Moon Village. 35 master students have developed hypothetical scenarios for a future Moon village. Interestingly the cooperative concept of the workshop led to a number of new themes, such as multipurpose mobile infrastructure, an astro-scientist training campus on the Moon, an experimental research food lab up to a lunar recycling facility.

Russian concepts

The Russian Federal Space Agency (Roscosmos) has planned a fully robotic lunar base called Lunny Poligon. The project was planned for 2020, with an expected completion date of 2037. On March 9, 2021, Russia turned to cooperate with China and signed a memorandum of understanding for the joint construction of the International Lunar Research Station (ILRS).

Soviet Union concepts

Zvezda 

Zvezda moonbase ("star") was a Soviet plan and project from 1962 to 1974 to construct a crewed moonbase as successor to the N1-L3 crewed lunar expedition program. 
The project was ordered by the Soviet space chief Korolyov to Barmin's 
Spetcmash bureau. The project was named DLB Lunar Base in technical specifications and Zvezda in government documents. Unofficially, the project was called Barmingrad (Barmin's city) by its designers.

The realization of the project depended on key parts of the N1-L3 program – the N-1 superheavy launcher, all 4 launches of which failed between 1969 and 1972. Zvezda moonbase was canceled with the rest of the Soviet human lunar programs. All crewed Soviet lunar programs, including a Zvezda moonbase, had been classified as top secret and were only published in the glasnost epoch since 1990.

Lunar Expeditionary Complex

Energia Lunar Expedition

United States concepts 

The United States has run several attempts to design and in some cases develop lunar outposts and the needed missions, the first being from 1959, with the upcoming Artemis missions being the most advanced.

Current: Artemis Program
The National Aeronautics and Space Administration of United States (NASA) requested an increase in the 2020 budget of $1.6 billion in order to make another crewed mission around the Moon in 2024, followed by a sustained presence on the Moon by 2028. NASA is ready to announce plans to bring together Commercial Human Lander Awards for Artemis Missions on the Moon. This specific program, “The Artemis Program,” encompasses NASA's overview for lunar exploration plans. This announcement will go over the first in a series of many more to come complex missions. Artemis I started the program as an uncrewed flight test to demonstrate the capabilities of NASA's Space Launch System (SLS) rocket and Orion spacecraft on November 16, 2022. The first flight with a crew will be Artemis II, closely followed by Artemis III that will land crew on the moon in 2025 using a new commercially procured Human Landing System (HLS), chosen to be Starship HLS. They hope to develop a sustainable lunar exploration program starting from 2028.

Other concepts 
In 1954, science fiction writer Arthur C. Clarke proposed a lunar base of inflatable modules covered in lunar dust for insulation. A spaceship assembled in low Earth orbit would launch to the Moon, and astronauts would set up the igloo-like modules and an inflatable radio mast. Subsequent steps would include the establishment of a larger, permanent dome; an algae-based air purifier; a nuclear reactor for the provision of power; and electromagnetic cannons to launch cargo and fuel to interplanetary vessels in space.

In 1959, John S. Rinehart suggested that the safest design would be a structure that could "[float] in a stationary ocean of dust", since there were, at the time this concept was outlined, theories that there could be mile-deep dust oceans on the Moon. The proposed design consisted of a half-cylinder with half-domes at both ends, with a micrometeoroid shield placed above the base.

In 1962, John DeNike and Stanley Zahn published their idea of a sub-surface base located at the Sea of Tranquility. This base would house a crew of 21, in modules placed four meters below the surface, which was believed to provide radiation shielding on par with Earth's atmosphere. DeNike and Zahn favored nuclear reactors for energy production, because they were more efficient than solar panels, and would also overcome the problems with the long lunar nights. For the life support system, an algae-based gas exchanger was proposed.

, the Japanese Aerospace Exploration Agency (JAXA) planned a human lunar landing around 2020 that would lead to a crewed lunar base by 2030; however, there was no budget yet for this project.

In 2007, Jim Burke, of the International Space University in France, said people should plan to preserve humanity's culture in the event of a civilization-stopping asteroid impact with Earth. A Lunar Noah's Ark was proposed. Subsequent planning may be taken up by the International Lunar Exploration Working Group (ILEWG).

In 2010, The Moon Capital Competition offered a prize for a design of a lunar habitat intended to be an underground international commercial center capable of supporting a residential staff of 60 people and their families. The Moon Capital is intended to be self-sufficient with respect to food and other material required for life support. Prize money was provided primarily by the Boston Society of Architects, Google Lunar X Prize and The New England Council of the American Institute of Aeronautics and Astronautics.

Other lunar surface infrastructure 

Beside temporary infrastructure of lunar missions, some of the permanently placed artificial objects on the Moon have fulfilled longterm purposes. Since 1969 retroreflectors have been installed on the surface of the Moon and used for lunar laser ranging.

The International Lunar Network was a in the 2010s proposed network of robotic instruments placed around the Moon.
Future Possible Inflatable Habitats

UK Space Agency Perseverance Mission

See also 
 Lunar habitation
 Human presence in space
 Human outpost
 Research station
 Space station
 Lunar Gateway
 Lunar Orbital Station
 Orbital Piloted Assembly and Experiment Complex
 Space observatory
 Mars habitat
 Human mission to Mars
 Lunar resources
 Moon in fiction

References

External links
Envisioning the Moon Village – Architectural Design Studio 2018

Exploration of the Moon
Human spaceflight